Restaurant is a 1998 American independent drama film starring Adrien Brody, Elise Neal, David Moscow and Simon Baker. Written by Tom Cudworth and directed by Eric Bross, Restaurant was the follow-up to this writing–directing duo's first film, TenBenny, which also starred Adrien Brody. Restaurant premiered at the Los Angeles Independent Film Festival on April 17, 1998, and garnered Adrien Brody an Independent Spirit Award nomination for Best Male Lead. Set in Hoboken, New Jersey, Restaurant is a romantic comedy about young waiters with big dreams, but few chances to actually succeed.

Plot
A Hoboken restaurant within sight of NYC and all of its promise is staffed with many aspiring artists of different races, who generally get along well. Chris Calloway, the bartender, is about to mount his first play, based on the fallout of a failed relationship. He strikes up a new relationship with the latest addition to the staff, a singer named Jeanine. The reemergence of his previous girlfriend Leslie, as well as the casting of Kenny, the man whom she cheated on Chris with, along with increasing racial aggression between certain employees, begins to take a toll on Chris.

Cast

Production
Director Bross and writer Cudworth had first met while working at the same Montclair, NJ restaurant, and had long thought about making a film in such a setting. Cudworth had also been involved with an African-American woman for a long time, inspiring the main storyline.

The film was shot in 28 days in New Jersey and New York. The workplace scenes were shot in an actual Hoboken restaurant, which had just been sold and renovated. After shooting, the owners initially kept the name it was given in the film, J.T. McClure's. However, it is now known as the Madison Bar & Grill.

Lauryn Hill was originally cast as the love interest and singer Jeanine. However, when she became pregnant, she was recast as the former girlfriend Leslie.

Awards and nominations
Atlantic City Film Festival
1999: Won, "Best Full Feature Drama"

Independent Spirit Awards
2001: Nominated, "Best Male Lead" - Adrien Brody

Soundtrack 

Tracklist 
 True Fortune "Paradise" 2:55
 Cap-One "Ladies & Willies" 4:37
 Evil Minds "All Mine" feat. Lord Tariq 3:57
 Rawcotiks "Place Ya Bets" 3:30
 N'Dea Davenport "No Never Again" 3:39
 Magic Juan "Piece Of Cake" 3:59
 Infinite "The Game Don't End" 3:34
 Shabaam Sahdeeq "Are You Ready" 3:49
 Rated Raw "From The Heart" 3:12
 Susan Garcia "In My Moment" feat. Magic Juan, Malik 3:44
 Old World Disorder "3 6 5" feat. Eminem 4:39
 Truck "Who Am I?" 4:30
 Adrien 'A. Ranger' Brody "This Ain't A Movie" feat. Rawcotiks 4:36

References

External links

 

1998 films
Films set in New Jersey
Films shot in New Jersey
Hoboken, New Jersey
American independent films
1998 drama films
1990s English-language films
Films about interracial romance
Films directed by Eric Bross
Films scored by Theodore Shapiro
1998 independent films
Films set in restaurants
1990s American films